They Say I'm Different is the second studio album by Betty Davis. It was released in 1974.

Legacy 

The Wire placed They Say I'm Different in their list of "100 Records That Set the World on Fire (While No One Was Listening)". In 2017 a documentary called Betty: They Say I'm Different was released.

Track listing
All songs written by Betty Davis

Personnel
Betty Davis - vocals
Debbie Burrell - vocals
Elaine Clark - vocals
Mary Jones - vocals
Trudy Perkins - vocals
Mike Clark - drums
Nicky Neal - drums, vocals
Willy Sparks - drums, vocals
Ted Sparks - drums
Pete Escovedo - timbales
Victor Pantoja - congas, percussion
Errol "Crusher" Bennett - percussion
Buddy Miles - guitar
Jimmy Godwin - guitar
Cordell Dudley - guitar, vocals
Carlos Morales - guitar, vocals
Larry Johnson - bass
Merl Saunders - electric piano
Fred Mills - keyboards, vocals
James Allen Smith - keyboards
Hershall Kennedy - Clavinet, keyboards, organ, electric piano, trumpet, vocals
Tony Vaughn - bass vocal, Clavinet, keyboards, piano, electric piano, vocals
Technical
Mel Dixon - photography
Bob Edwards - assistant engineer
Tom Flye - mixing
Ron Levine - cover design
Bill Levy - art direction

References

External links
 Album Information at allmusic.com

1974 albums
Betty Davis albums